The Dean of Ferns is based at The Cathedral Church of St Edan, Ferns in the united Diocese of Cashel and Ossory within the Church of Ireland.

The incumbent is Paul Mooney.

List

1272-1282 Richard  of Northampton (appointed  Bishop of Ferns 1282)
1558–1559 John Garvie (afterwards Archdeacon of Meath and Bishop of Kilmore 1585)
1559 John Devereux (appointed Bishop of Ferns, 1566 but with right to retain deanery in commendam for five years)
1568/9 Walter Turner
1590 William Campyon or Champion 
1601–1625 Thomas Ram (afterwards Bishop of Ferns and Leighlin, 1605 but retaining deanery in commendam)
1610 (John Thoms)?
1625/6 Thomas Ram jnr
1628/9 Robert Wilson
1642/3 Anthony Proctor
1661 John Watson
1666–1670 John Creighton
1670–1672 Benjamin Phipps (afterwards Dean of Down, 1682)
1682–1694 Tobias Pullen (afterwards Bishop of Cloyne, 1694)
1694 Thomas Cox
1719–1720 William Crosse (afterwards Dean of Lismore 1720)
1720–1724 Arthur Price (afterwards Bishop of Clonfert and Kilmacduagh, 1724) 
1724–1727/8 Pascal (or Paul) Ducasse (afterwards Dean of Clogher, 1717)
1727/8– Thomas Sawbridge
1733–1734 George Stone (afterwards Dean of Derry 1734 and later Bishop of Ferns, 1740)
1734-1740 Joseph Story (afterwards Bishop of Killaloe, 1740)
1740–1747 Robert Watts (afterwards Dean of Kilkenny, 1747)
1747–1769 John Alcock
1769–1787 Richard Marlay (afterwards Bishop of Clonfert and Kilmacduagh, 1787)
1787–1794 Hon Thomas Stopford (afterwards Bishop of Cork and Ross, 1794)
1794–1842 Peter Browne
1842–1862 Henry Newland
1862–1862 Hamilton Verschoyle (afterwards Bishop of Kilmore, Elphin and Ardagh, 1862)
1863–1879 William Atkins
1879–1892 John R Dowse
1892–1896 Charles Hind
1896–1897 Humphrey Eakins Ellison
1897–1898 Jonathan Sisson Cooper
1899–1908 John Alexander
1908–1926 Thomas Brownell Gibson
1926–1932 Henry Cameron Lyster
1932-1936 William Gibson
1936-1949 Alfred Forbes
1949-1979 Thomas Henry Crampton McFall
1979-1994 David Kaye Lee Earl
1995-2011 Leslie David Arthur Forrest
2011–present Paul Gerard Mooney

References

 
Diocese of Cashel and Ossory
Ferns